Imran Nazir may refer to:
 Imran Nazir (cricketer), Pakistani cricketer
 Imran Nazir (politician), Pakistani politician
 Imran Nazir (writer), Pakistani writer